The Girls' Greater Catholic League (abbreviated GGCL, formerly the Girls' Greater Cincinnati League) is a high school sports league composed of five all-girls schools in the Archdiocese of Cincinnati. In 2013, the girls' teams at the league's co-ed schools joined the Greater Catholic League, which until then was the GGCL's counterpart for boys.

Mission

The mission of the league is to provide and promote a Christian atmosphere for the development of young ladies through interscholastic competition. Good sportsmanship and respect is of the utmost importance and school spirit will always be encouraged. The GGCL athletic activities are organized and supervised in harmony with policies of the member schools and the Ohio High School Athletic Association.

Teams
Mercy McAuley High School
Mount Notre Dame High School
St. Ursula Academy
Seton High School
Ursuline Academy

History

In 1966 the first league competition began among a group of girls' Catholic high schools in the area. Extramural games in basketball and volleyball were played among the schools in the next couple of years. Few records were kept and the league was loosely organized by some coaches and students.

This was not the first competition for these schools. Most had participated in play days and games for quite a few years. Prior to league competition, emphasis was placed on the social aspect of sport. The refreshments and social hour after the game were as important or more important than the game. Rivalries were friendly and the game scores incidental.

In the first years schools were represented at league meetings by interested teachers and often students were delegated to attend. At first, some educators resisted the formation of a structured league. As new people entered the schools and assumed responsibility for sports programs changes occurred in the league.

Structure was added to the league, and rules and policies were made to meet the needs of the emerging girl athlete. Regular meetings were held and slowly the emphasis shifted from cookies and punch to skill development and highly contested games. League championships were held and many regular season games were well attended.

With the onset of State sponsored tournaments for girls in 1975–1976 it became obvious that the league was one of the strongest in the city and state. In the first state volleyball tournament Seton was AAA Runner Up and Ursuline AA Champions. Since then the league has usually been represented in State Tournaments in most sports.

The publicity and excellent play the League has fostered has meant opportunities for member students to receive athletic scholarships. College coaches look to this League for skilled athletics and Christian sportswomen to complement their programs.

As years go by additional sports have become League sports. All-League athletes are honored each year in all League sports. Each year the League takes on new challenges to improve girls' sports.

Beginning with the 2013–14 school year, the league experienced a restructuring. The co-ed schools formerly in the GGCL began competing in the co-ed division (separate from the GGCL), while the co-ed division schools continued to play games against GGCL schools in a renamed Girls' Greater Catholic League. Previously, GGCL schools were split into two divisions: the GGCL Gray consisted of the co-ed schools, while the Scarlet consisted of the all female schools. The boys from the co-ed member schools compete in the GCL.

In 2018, Mother of Mercy High School merged with McAuley High School to become Mercy McAuley High School, bringing the league's membership to five schools.

State championships

See also
Greater Catholic League

External links

Ohio high school sports conferences
Sports competitions in Cincinnati
Sports teams in Dayton, Ohio
Catholic sports organizations